Eugenie Frederica Shonnard  (1886–1978) was an American sculptor and painter born in Yonkers, New York.

Career 
Shonnard began her art studies at the New York School of Applied Design for Women with Alphonse Mucha and at the Art Students League with James Earle Fraser.  In 1911 she moved to Paris where she studied with sculptors Antoine Bourdelle and Auguste Rodin.  There she exhibited at the Paris Salons of 1912, 1913 and 1922. Shonnard also exhibited at the Pennsylvania Academy of Fine Arts in 1916, the Museum of Modern Art in 1933 and the 1939 New York World's Fair. Among her notable early sculptures are busts of Alphonse Mucha and Dinah, the Bronx Zoo's first gorilla.

In 1926, Edgar L. Hewett, director of the School of American Research invited her to settle in Santa Fe, New Mexico, where she was given studio space at the Museum of New Mexico. While in New Mexico she became well respected for her carvings of Pueblo Indians. She traveled to the Pueblos and learned how they make pottery with Maximiliana, the sister of famous San Ildefonso potter, Maria Martinez. Shonnard's Pueblo Indian with Bowl sculpture was unanimously chosen to represent New Mexico in the 1938 exhibition of sculpture at the Architectural League in New York. She had solo exhibitions at the New Mexico Museum of Art in 1928, 1937 and 1954 and at the Roswell Museum and Art Center in 1969. In May 1954 she was awarded an honorary fellowship in fine arts by the School of American Research and Museum of New Mexico.

Shonnard was an early proponent of the "direct carving" style of creating sculpture. She developed a cement material she called Keenstone which she used for both sculptural and architectural work.

Shonnard was a member of the National Association of Women Artists and the National Sculpture Society and exhibited at their 1923 and 1929 exhibitions. In 1939 she created wood panels—Indians and Cattle—for the U.S. Court House and Post Office in Waco, Texas, through the Section of Painting and Sculpture.

Personal life 
Shonnard was the daughter of Civil War Major Frederic Shonnard of the 6th New York Heavy Artillery Regiment, and Eugenie Smyth Shonnard, a descendant of Declaration of Independence signatory Francis Lewis. On July 26, 1933 she married E. Gordon Ludlam.

Collections
Works by Shonnard can be found in:
 Metropolitan Museum of Art, New York
 Hudson River Museum, Yonkers, New York
 New Mexico Museum of Art, Santa Fe, New Mexico
 Immaculate Heart of Mary Seminary, Chapel, Santa Fe, New Mexico
 Sacred Heart of Mary Chapel, Santa Fe, New Mexico
 New Mexico Veterans Center, Truth or Consequences, New Mexico
 Sandia Preparatory School, Albuquerque, New Mexico
 Cleveland Museum of Art, Cleveland, Ohio
 Brookgreen Gardens, Murrells Inlet, South Carolina
 Colorado Springs Fine Arts Center, Colorado Springs, Colorado
 Panhandle-Plains Historical Museum, Canyon, Texas
 Musée National d'Art Moderne, Centre Georges-Pompidou, Paris, France
 Luxembourg Museum, Paris, France

References

1886 births
1978 deaths
20th-century American sculptors
American women sculptors
Painters from New York City
Art Students League of New York alumni
New York School of Applied Design for Women alumni
Artists from Santa Fe, New Mexico
Artists of the American West
Section of Painting and Sculpture artists
20th-century American painters
American women painters
People from Yonkers, New York
20th-century American women artists
Federal Art Project artists
National Sculpture Society members
Sculptors from New York (state)
Sculptors from New Mexico